= Thazhava North =

Village in Kollam District, Kerala, India

Thazhava North, also known as Kuthirapanthi, is a small village in the Kollam district of Kerala, India. The distance between Thazhava North and New Delhi, the capital, is 1260.18 miles or 2028.07 kilometers.
